Alexander H. “Sparky” Von Plinsky IV (born July 11, 1977) is a New Hampshire politician.

Education
Von Plinsky earned a master's degree in landscape architecture from the University of Massachusetts and a bachelor's degree in public administration from Brenau University.

Military career
Von Plinsky has served in the United States Army.

Political career
On November 6, 2018, Von Plinsky was elected to the New Hampshire House of Representatives where he represents the Cheshire 7 district. Von Plinsky assumed office on December 5, 2018. Von Plinsky is a Democrat. Von Plinsky endorsed Bernie Sanders in the 2020 Democratic Party presidential primaries.

Personal life
Von Plinsky resides in Keene, New Hampshire. Von Plinsky is married to Brenda and has two children.

References

Living people
1970s births
People from Keene, New Hampshire
Brenau University alumni
University of Massachusetts alumni
Democratic Party members of the New Hampshire House of Representatives
21st-century American politicians